Jonesboro-Hodge High School is a high school located in Jonesboro in Jackson Parish, Louisiana. The school mascot is the Tiger, named after LSU. The colors are scarlet and royal blue. The school, a part of the Jackson Parish School Board, serves the Town of Jonesboro and the Village of Hodge.

History
The first school house in Jonesboro, comprising 11 grades, was located at the corner of 3rd and Cooper. The brick building completed in 1913 was destroyed by fire in 1925. The new J-HHS building was constructed during the most economically depressed era of American History. 
The architectural beauty of the structure soon came to symbolize Jonesboro-Hodge High School.

The school named its football stadium "Caldwell Peacock" in honor of Neil Caldwell (a former athletic director and head football coach at the school who died in the U.S. Army Air Corps) and Gordon Peacock (a member of the football team who died of pneumonia).

Faculty
The school faculty is made up of approximately 38 teachers who instruct in a wide array of disciplines.  Courses include: Agricultural Science, Auto Mechanics, Nursing, Mathematics, Science, English, Spanish, Computer Science, Publications, Health & Physical Education, Social Studies, Gifted Music, and Choir.

School uniforms
The students are required to wear school uniforms with the choice of jeans and spirit shirts or jeans and regular uniform shirts.

Athletics
Jonesboro-Hodge High is a Class 2A member of the LHSAA and competes in District 2.

Jonesboro-Hodge High School has a wide array of sports, including football, baseball, softball, basketball, track, golf, and dance (Tiger Paw Dance Line).

State Championships 
(5) Football championships: 1930, 1945, 1987, 1988, 1989

Notable alumni

 Rodney Alexander, Class of 1964, former U.S. Representative
 Marty Booker, Class of 1994, NFL football player
 Randy Ewing, Class of 1962, former Louisiana State Senate President
 John Garlington, Class of 1964, NFL football player
 Randy Moffett, Class of 1965, President of the University of Louisiana System

References

External links
 

Public high schools in Louisiana
Educational institutions established in 1913
Schools in Jackson Parish, Louisiana
1913 establishments in Louisiana